National Route 412 is a national highway of Japan connecting Hiratsuka, Kanagawa and Sagamihara, Kanagawa via Atsugi, with a total length of 48.6 km (30.2 mi).

References

National highways in Japan
Roads in Kanagawa Prefecture